General Motors has produced three different engines called LT1:
 1970–19722LT-1 – Chevrolet Generation I Small-Block
 1992–1997 LT1 – GM Generation II Small-Block
 2013–(current) LT1 - GM Generation V Small-Block.